Bbaale County is a county in the Kayunga District in Uganda. It occupies the northern half of the district. It contains four sub-counties. It is represented in the Uganda Parliament by Sulaiman Madada, who also serves as the State Minister for the Elderly and the Disabled.

Sub-Counties
 Bbaale Sub-county
 Garilaya Sub-county
 Kayonza Sub-county
 Kitimbwa Sub-county

Population
The total population of the four sub-counties of Bbaale County, was approximately 123,150 as of November 2011.

See also
 Bbaale
 Ntenjeru County

References

External links
 Web Portal of Kayunga District
 First Lady Advises Kayunga District Residents To Use Available Resources For Development

Counties of Kayunga District
Kayunga District